North Peninsula State Park is a Florida State Park, located north of Ormond-By-The-Sea and east of the Bulow Plantation Ruins Historic State Park, off A1A.

Images

External links

 North Peninsula State Park at Florida State Parks

State parks of Florida
Parks in Volusia County, Florida
Protected areas established in 1984